Ponder can refer to:

People:
 Amos Lee Ponder (1887–1959), Justice of the Louisiana Supreme Court
 Bruce Ponder, Director of and Professor of Oncology at the Cancer Research UK Cambridge Research Institute
 Christian Ponder (born 1988), starting quarterback for the Minnesota Vikings football team
 Elmer Ponder (1893-1974), Major League Baseball pitcher
 James Ponder (1819–1897), an American merchant and politician
 Patricia Maxwell née Ponder (born 1942), American romance writer
 Samantha Ponder (born 1987), American sportscaster and wife of Christian Ponder
 William Thomas Ponder (1893-1947), American World War I flying ace
 William David Ponder (1855–1933), South Australian politician
 Winston Ponder (born c. 1944), Australian malacologist (studier of molluscs)

Other uses:
 Ponder, Missouri, a ghost town
 Ponder, Texas, a town in the United States
 Ponder (horse), American Thoroughbred racehorse and 1949 Kentucky Derby winner
 Glen Ponder, a character in the UK comedy series Knowing Me, Knowing You
 Ponder Stibbons, a character from Terry Pratchett's Diskworld series.
 Permanent brain (or "pondering"), the usage of the opponent's time for thinking in turn-based games
 "Ponder", a song by Knuckle Puck from their 2015 album Copacetic